Balduin Kusbock (1892 – 25 January 1933 Tartu) was an Estonian film director, actor and producer; one of the Estonian film pioneers.

In 1923 he established the first film studio in Estonia (Eesti Filmi Stuudio).

Filmography
 1925 "Esimese öö õigus" (feature film; director and scenarist)
 1930 "Pühapäevakütid" (feature film; director)

References

1892 births
1933 deaths
Estonian film directors
Estonian screenwriters
People from Tartu
20th-century screenwriters